Le petit café is a 1931  French-language American Pre-Code musical film directed by Ludwig Berger and starring Maurice Chevalier, Yvonne Vallée and Tania Fédor. The film is a foreign-language version of the 1930 film Playboy of Paris, which was based on the play The Little Cafe by Tristan Bernard. Multiple-language versions were common in the years following the introduction of sound film, before the practice of dubbing became widespread. It was shot at the Joinville Studios in Paris.

The film received a better reception from critics than the English-language version had.

Synopsis
Albert Loriflan, a waiter in a Paris cafe, unexpectedly inherits a large sum of money from a wealthy relative. His unscrupulous boss, Philibert, refuses to release him from his long-term contract in the hope that Albert will buy him off with a large payment. But Albert refuses, and continues to work at the cafe even though he is now very rich. Before long he falls in love with Philibert's daughter Yvonne.

Cast
 Maurice Chevalier as Albert Lorifian 
 Yvonne Vallée as Yvonne Philibert 
 Tania Fédor as Mademoiselle Berengère 
 André Berley as Pierre Bourdin 
 Emile Chautard as Philibert 
 Françoise Rosay as Mademoiselle Edwige 
 George Davis as Paul Michel 
 Jacques Jou-Jerville as M. Cadeaux 
 André Baugé   
 Sonia Sebor

References

Bibliography
 Bradley, Edwin M. The First Hollywood Musicals: A Critical Filmography Of 171 Features, 1927 Through 1932. McFarland, 2004.

External links

1931 films
American musical comedy films
1931 musical comedy films
1930s French-language films
American multilingual films
Films directed by Ludwig Berger
American films based on plays
Paramount Pictures films
Films set in Paris
American black-and-white films
Films shot at Joinville Studios
1931 multilingual films
1930s American films